Joseph-Octave Beaubien (March 22, 1824 – November 7, 1877) was a Quebec physician and political figure. He represented Montmagny in the 1st Canadian Parliament as a Conservative member.

He was born in Nicolet in Lower Canada in 1824, studied at the college there and then studied English in Rochester, New York. He returned and studied medicine, becoming a doctor in 1847 and settled at Montmagny. He was elected to represent Montmagny in the Legislative Assembly of the Province of Canada in 1857, 1861 and 1863; he was reelected after Confederation. He served in the cabinet as Commissioner of Crown Lands. He was also named to the Legislative Council of Quebec for La Durantaye division in 1867 and served until his death. He operated large farms at Montmagny and Cap-Saint-Ignace. Beaubien served as lieutenant-colonel in the local militia. He was also a director for the Canadian Pacific Railway.

He died in Montmagny in 1877.

He was the nephew of Pierre Beaubien, who had also been a member in the Legislative Assembly from Canada East. His daughter, Caroline-Alix, married Jules-Joseph-Taschereau Frémont, who later became a member of the House of Commons.

Electoral record

References
 
 
 

1824 births
1877 deaths
Members of the Legislative Assembly of the Province of Canada from Canada East
Conservative Party of Canada (1867–1942) MPs
Members of the House of Commons of Canada from Quebec
Conservative Party of Quebec MLCs